Márquez or Marquez is a surname of Spanish origin, meaning "son of Marcos or Marcus". Its Portuguese equivalent is Marques.

It should not be confused with the surname Marqués, also of Spanish origin.

People
Adrian Garcia Marquez, American sportscaster
Alfredo Chavez Marquez, American judge
Alejandro Márquez, Chilean footballer
Álex Márquez, Spanish motorcycle racer
Alexis Márquez (disambiguation)
Alfonso Márquez, Mexican Major League Baseball umpire
Alfonso Marquez (basketball), Filipino basketball player
Alfonso Márquez de la Plata, Chilean politician
Ana Marquez-Greene, victim of the Sandy Hook Elementary School shooting
Andrés Leonardo Márquez, Uruguayan footballer
Ángel Márquez, Mexican footballer
Anna Dominique Marquez-Lim Coseteng, Filipina politician
Anthony Marquez, American actor
Antonio García Márquez, Spanish footballer
Antonio Márquez Ramírez, Mexican football referee
Arturo Márquez, Mexican composer
Baltasar Márquez, Spanish rower
Bartolome Blanco Marquez, Spanish martyr
Bartolomé de Jesús Masó Márquez, Cuban politician
Bernardo Márquez García, Puerto Rican mayor
Berta Arocena de Martínez Márquez, Cuban activist
Bradley Marquez, American football player
Brailyn Márquez, Dominican Major League Baseball pitcher
Carlos Labbé Márquez, Chilean bishop
Carlos Márquez Sterling, Cuban politician
Carolina Márquez, Colombian-Italian musician
Celina Márquez, Salvadoran swimmer
Cristóbal Márquez, Spanish footballer
Daniel Márquez, Mexican footballer
Daniel Razo Marquez, Mexican footballer
Darina Márquez, Mexican musician 
David Márquez, Spanish racewalker
David Marquez (comics), American comic book artist
David W. Márquez, former attorney general of Alaska
Dayron Márquez, Colombian javelin thrower
Domingo Márquez, Argentine actor
Edith Márquez, Mexican singer
Eduardo Márquez Talledo, Peruvian composer
Elías Cárdenas Márquez, Mexican politician
Emilio González Márquez, Mexican politician
Emilio Márquez, American drummer
Emilio Z. Marquez, Filipino bishop
Empoy Marquez, Filipino actor
Enrique Macaya Márquez, Argentine sports journalist
Enrique Márquez Climent, Spanish footballer
Enrique Márquez Jaramillo, Mexican poet
Enrique Marquez Jr., accomplice in the 2015 San Bernardino mass shooting
Esperanza Márquez, Spanish rower
Esteban Márquez de Velasco, Spanish painter
Evaristo Márquez, Colombian actor
Evaristo Márquez Contreras, Spanish sculptor
Favio Márquez, Argentine footballer
Felipe González Márquez, Spanish prime minister
Félix Márquez, Venezuelan boxer
Fernando Andrés Márquez, Argentine footballer
Fernando Márquez de la Plata, Chilean president
Fernando Márquez Joya, Spanish painter
Fernando Yunes Márquez, Mexican politician
Floria Márquez, Venezuelan singer
Francia Márquez, Vice President of Colombia
Francisco Márquez, Mexican military cadet
Francisco Márquez Tinoco, Mexican politician
Francisco Menéndez Márquez, Spanish colonial governor
Frank Chamizo Marquez, Cuban-Italian wrestler
Gabriel García Márquez, Colombian Nobel prize-winning author
Gabriel Márquez, Mexican footballer
Generoso Márquez, Cuban basketball player
Germán Márquez, Venezuelan Major League Baseball pitcher
Gonzalo Márquez, Venezuelan Major League Baseball first baseman
Gorka Márquez, Spanish dancer
Graciela Márquez, Venezuelan volleyball player
Graciela Márquez Colín, Mexican economist
Guillermo Márquez Lizalde, Mexican politician
Harry Márquez, Puerto Rican politician
Herbys Márquez, Venezuelan weightlifter
Hernán Márquez, Mexican boxer
Horacio Sánchez Marquez, Mexican footballer
Hudson Marquez, American artist
Isidro Márquez, Mexican Major League Baseball player
Iván Márquez, Colombian guerrilla leader and FARC member
Iván Márquez Álvarez, Spanish footballer
Iván Márquez (volleyball), Venezuelan volleyball player
Javi Márquez, Spanish footballer
Jean Márquez, Guatemalan footballer
Jeff Marquez, American Major League Baseball pitcher
Jesús Márquez Rodríguez, Puerto Rican mayor
Joey Marquez, Filipino actor and politician
John Márquez, California politician
John Marquez (actor), British actor
Jorge Eduardo Márquez, Mexican footballer
Jorge L. Márquez Pérez, Puerto Rican mayor
Jorge Márquez Gómez, Venezuelan footballer
José Antonio Franco Márquez, Spanish footballer
José Ignacio de Márquez, Colombian politician
José Jesús Márquez, Spanish taekwondo athlete
Jose Midas Marquez, Filipino attorney
José Victoriano Huerta Márquez, Mexican president
Joseph Marquez, professional Super Smash Bros player
Josue Marquez, Spanish boxer
Juan Márquez, Spanish writer
Juan Albano Pereira Márquez, Portuguese merchant
Juan Carlos Márquez, Spanish-Venezuelan businessman
Juan Carlos Muñoz Márquez, Mexican politician
Juan Manuel Márquez, Mexican professional boxer
Juan Márquez Cabrera, Spanish colonial governor
Juan Menéndez Márquez, Spanish colonial governor
Juan Pérez Márquez, Spanish handball player 
Julian Marquez, American UFC fighter
Karel Marquez, Filipina actress
Kathrin Barboza Marquez, Bolivian biologist
Kenny Marquez, member of the American band Renegade
Laureano Márquez, Spanish-Venezuelan humorist
Lea Márquez Peterson, American politician
Leonardo Márquez, Mexican general
Linda Esperanza Marquez, California community activist and namesake of Linda Esperanza Marquez High School
Lucas Márquez (footballer, born 1988), Argentine footballer
Lucas Márquez (footballer, born 1990), Argentine footballer
Luis Márquez, Puerto Rican Major League Baseball player
Luis Alberto Márquez, Mexican footballer
Luz Márquez, Spanish actress
Manuel Márquez Roca, Spanish footballer
Manuel Márquez Sterling, Cuban politician
Manuela Antonia Márquez García-Saavedra (1844-1890), Peruvian writer, poet, composer pianist
Marc Márquez, Spanish motorcycle racer
Marcos Márquez, Spanish footballer
Maria Alejandra Marquez, wife of musician Tico Torres
María de los Ángeles Cano Márquez, Colombian activist
Maria Stella Márquez, Colombian beauty queen
Mariano Marquez, Puerto Rican boxer
Marisa Marquez, American legislator
Martin Marquez, British actor
Mauricio Márquez, Venezuelan footballer
Melanie Marquez, Filipina beauty queen, Miss International 1979
Menéndez Márquez (disambiguation)
Miguel Ángel J. Márquez Ruiz, Mexican veterinarian
Miguel Marquez, American news correspondent
Miguel Márquez Márquez, Mexican politician
Monica Márquez, American judge
Nelly Márquez Zapata, Mexican politician
Nicomedes Márquez Joaquín, Filipino writer
Ofelia Márquez Huitzil, Mexican artist
Pablo Márquez, Argentine guitarist
Pablo Marquez, Ecuadorean wrestler
Paloma Márquez, Mexican actress
Paula Contreras Márquez, Spanish writer
Paz Márquez-Benítez, Filipina writer
Pedro Menéndez Márquez, Spanish conquistador
Pedro Pablo Pérez Márquez, Cuban cyclist
Pío García-Escudero Márquez, Spanish architect
Pompeyo Márquez, Venezuelan politician
Rafael Márquez, Mexican footballer
Rafael Márquez (boxer), Mexican professional boxer
Rafael Márquez Esqueda, Mexican footballer
Rafael Márquez Lugo, Mexican footballer
Rafael Ángel Rondón Márquez, Venezuelan writer
Ramona Marquez, English child actress
Ranulfo Márquez Hernández, Mexican politician
Raúl Márquez, American boxer
Ramón Zaydín y Márquez Sterling, Cuban politician
Raymond Márquez a.k.a. Spanish Raymond Márquez or Spanish Raymond (born 1930), American gangster who ran the Harlem numbers racket
Rene Marquez, Puerto Rican writer
Rey Marquez, Filipino sports executive
Ricardo Márquez, Colombian footballer
Richie Marquez, American soccer player
Roberta Marquez, Brazilian ballet dancer
Roberto Márquez (field hockey), Argentine field hockey player
Roberto Márquez (painter), Mexican painter
Rosemary Márquez, American judge
Salvador Márquez, Mexican footballer
Salvador Márquez Lozornio, Mexican politician
Sandra Marquez, American actor
Sheila Márquez, Spanish fashion model
Soraya Marquez, American street artist Indie184
Teejay Marquez, Filipino actor
Teresita Marquez, Filipina model and actress, Reina Hispanoamericana 2017
Tintín Márquez, Spanish footballer
Valeria Márquez (born 2004), Spanish rhythmic gymnastics 
Vanessa Marquez, American actress
Vanessa Rubio Márquez, Mexican politician
Vernon Oswald Marquez, Trinidadian businessman
Victoria Méndez Márquez, Mexican politician
Victorino Márquez Bustillos, Venezuelan former president
Walter Márquez, Uruguayan basketball player
William Márquez Uzcátegui, member of the Venezuelan boy band Los Chamos
Yénier Márquez, Cuban footballer
Zia Marquez, Filipina actress

Fictional characters
 Chuny Marquez, character from the television show ER
 Diego Marquez, main character of Go, Diego, Go!
 Dora Marquez, the main protagonist of the television series Dora the Explorer
 Eva Marquez, main character of New Amsterdam (2008 TV series)
 Gabrielle (Marquez) Solis, main character of Desperate Housewives
 Juanita Marquez, character in the novel Snow Crash
 Lea Marquez, character from the soap opera All My Children
 Lorena Marquez, Aquagirl in Aquaman by DC Comics
 Mandy Marquez, character from the BBC soap opera Doctors
 Mimi Marquez, central character in Rent (musical)
 Samantha (Sam) Marquez, main character of Las Vegas (TV series)

References

Spanish-language surnames